Court security officer may refer to:

Court security officer (England and Wales)
Court security officers of the United States Marshals Service

See also
Bailiff
Connecticut Judicial Marshal
New York State Court Officers
Officer of the court